Pierre Allès (30 May 1916 – 28 May 2012) was an Algerian racing cyclist. He rode in the 1937 Tour de France.

References

External links
 

1916 births
2012 deaths
Algerian male cyclists
21st-century Algerian people